Mark Elrick (born 7 April 1967 in Auckland) is a retired New Zealand soccer player who last played as a striker for Hawke's Bay United. He is mostly being used as a substitute, due to his age.

He has played for several teams in his native country and came out of retirement in November 2006 to join struggling Hawke's Bay. He had been player-coach at Onehunga Sports in Auckland for the last two years. A spectator at Hawke's Bay's 2–1 loss to Waitakere United Elrick approached Jonathan Gould after the match and asked if the Park Island club would be interested in his services. An agreement was immediately reached on the spot. Also, he works occasionally as a football commentator for SKY TV.

Elrick scored a hat-trick in the final of the 1999 New Zealand National Soccer League, a match which Central United won 3–1 over Dunedin Technical.

He has played 40 times for the New Zealand national soccer team, the All Whites, including 30 A-internationals in which he scored 3 goals.

References

External links
 

1967 births
Living people
Association footballers from Auckland
New Zealand association footballers
New Zealand international footballers
National Soccer League (Australia) players
North Shore United AFC players
Football Kingz F.C. players
Hawke's Bay United FC players
Waitakere City FC players
Association football forwards
1996 OFC Nations Cup players
1999 FIFA Confederations Cup players